Ross Hiern (2 August 1922 – 21 August 1999) was an Australian cricketer. He played in twelve first-class matches for South Australia between 1949 and 1954.

See also
 List of South Australian representative cricketers

References

External links
 

1922 births
1999 deaths
Australian cricketers
South Australia cricketers
Cricketers from Adelaide